What the Butler Saw is a two-act farce written by the English playwright Joe Orton. He began work on the play in 1966 and completed it in July 1967, one month before his death. It opened at the Queen's Theatre in London on 5 March 1969. Orton's final play, it was the second to be performed after his death, following Funeral Games in 1968.

Plot summary
 Characters
 Dr Prentice
 Geraldine Barclay
 Mrs Prentice
 Nicholas Beckett
 Dr Rance
 Sergeant Match

The play consists of two acts - though the action is continuous - and revolves around a Dr Prentice, a psychiatrist attempting to seduce his attractive prospective secretary, Geraldine Barclay. The play opens with the doctor examining Geraldine in a job interview, during which he persuades her to undress. The situation becomes more intense when Mrs Prentice enters, causing the doctor to hide Geraldine behind a curtain.

His wife, however, is also being seduced and blackmailed, by Nicholas Beckett. She therefore promises Nicholas the post as secretary, which adds further confusion, including Nicholas, Geraldine and a police officer dressing as members of the opposite sex.

Dr Prentice's clinic is also faced with a government inspection, led by Dr Rance, which reveals the chaos in the clinic. Dr Rance talks about how he will use the situation to develop a new book: "The final chapters of my book are knitting together: incest, buggery, outrageous women and strange love-cults catering for depraved appetites. All the fashionable bric-a-brac." A penis ("the missing parts of Sir Winston Churchill") is held aloft in the climactic scene.

Productions

Premiere
The original production, having toured briefly from January 1969, opened in the West End at the Queen's Theatre on 5 March. Presented by Lewenstein-Delfont Productions Ltd and H. M. Tennent Ltd, it was directed by Robert Chetwyn and designed by Hutchinson Scott.

 Cast
 Stanley Baxter – Dr Prentice
 Julia Foster – Geraldine Barclay
 Coral Browne – Mrs Prentice
 Hayward Morse – Nicholas Beckett
 Ralph Richardson – Dr Rance
 Peter Bayliss – Sergeant Match

Stage revivals
1) A revival at London's Royal Court Theatre, directed by Lindsay Anderson, opened in July 1975 and transferred to the Whitehall Theatre the following month.

 Cast
 Michael Medwin – Dr Prentice
 Jane Carr – Geraldine Barclay
 Betty Marsden – Mrs Prentice
 Kevin Lloyd – Nicholas Beckett
 Valentine Dyall – Dr Rance
 Brian Glover – Sergeant Match

2) A revival in April 1977 at Leicester's Phoenix Arts Centre was directed by Antonia Bird. She realised that the last line of the play had been given to the wrong character, and by referring to Orton's handwritten manuscript was able to give it back to the correct character.

3) A revival at London's Hampstead Theatre, directed by John Tillinger, opened in November 1990 and transferred to the Wyndham's Theatre in January 1991.

 Cast
 Clive Francis – Dr Prentice
 Camille Coduri – Geraldine Barclay
 Sheila Gish – Mrs Prentice
 Ben Porter – Nicholas Beckett
 Joseph Maher – Dr Rance
 Gary Olsen – Sergeant Match

4) The play was revived in 1994 at The Royal Exchange Theatre, directed by Robert Delamere, and ran from 7 April to 7 May.

 Cast
 David Horovitch – Dr Prentice
 Kate Winslet – Geraldine Barclay
 Deborah Norton – Mrs Prentice
 Neil Stuke – Nicholas Beckett
 Trevor Baxter – Dr Rance
 Billy Hartman – Sergeant Match

5) In 1995, a Royal National Theatre production of the play premiered in February at the RNT's Lyttelton Theatre and then went on tour prior to returning to the RNT repertoire. Phyllida Lloyd directed the play.

 Cast
 John Alderton – Dr Prentice
 Debra Gillett – Geraldine Barclay
 Nicola Pagett – Mrs Prentice
 David Tennant – Nicholas Beckett
 Richard Wilson – Dr Rance
 Jeremy Swift – Sergeant Match

6) There was a further revival in 2012 at the Vaudeville Theatre, directed by Sean Foley, which ran from 16 May to 25 August.

Cast
 Tim McInnerny – Dr Prentice
 Georgia Tennant – Geraldine Barclay
 Samantha Bond – Mrs Prentice
 Nick Hendrix – Nicholas Beckett
 Omid Djalili – Dr Rance
 Jason Thorpe – Sergeant Match

7) A 2017 production directed by Nikolai Foster was a co-production between the Curve Theatre, Leicester and the Theatre Royal, Bath.

Cast
 Rufus Hound – Dr Prentice
 Dakota Blue Richards – Geraldine Barclay
 Catherine Russell – Mrs Prentice
 Jack Holden – Nicholas Beckett
 Jasper Britton – Dr Rance
 Ravi Aujla – Sergeant Match

Television
In 1987 the play was adapted for BBC2's Theatre Night series. First transmitted on 24 May, it was produced by Shaun Sutton and directed by Barry Davis.

 Cast
 Dinsdale Landen – Dr Prentice
 Tessa Peake-Jones – Geraldine Barclay
 Prunella Scales – Mrs Prentice
 Tyler Butterworth – Nicholas Beckett
 Timothy West – Dr Rance
 Bryan Pringle – Sergeant Match

Channel 4's Blow Your Mind – See a Show series included a short extract from the play. Featuring Brian Cox as Dr Prentice, Frances Barber as Mrs Prentice and Clive Owen as Nicholas Beckett, it was transmitted on 18 September 1995.

References

External links

 
 

1969 plays
Obie Award-winning plays
Off-Broadway plays
Plays by Joe Orton
Plays set in England
Plays set in the 20th century
West End plays
Black comedy plays